Industrial management is a branch of engineering which facilitates creation of management system and integrates the diverse engineering processes. Industrial Management deals with industrial design, construction, management, and application of science and engineering principles to improve the entire industrial infrastructure and industrial processes.

Industrial Management focuses on the management of industrial processes. Industrial Managers can be said to be responsible for proper and the most efficient interaction of 4Ms: Man, Material, Machine and Method (which every organization needs).

Industrial management also involves studying the performance of machines as well as people. Specialists are employed to keep machines in good working condition and to ensure the quality of their production. The flow of materials through the plant is supervised to ensure that neither workers nor machines are idle. Constant inspection is made to keep output up to standard.

As a part of engineering and particularly related to the manufacturing engineering industry, studies the structure and organization of industrial companies. It comprises those fields of industrial issues that are necessary for the success of companies within the manufacturing sector.

Who is an Industrial Manager?
An Industrial Manager incorporates the principles of manufacturing system, logistics, supply chain management, materials management, entrepreneurship, among other things. Industrial Managers plan how to efficiently and economically use resources in a business including labor, materials, machines, time, capital, energy, and information. An Industrial Manager also has to deal with creating new systems to solve problems related to waste and inefficiency associated with a business/ industrial process. This field is ever in need of competent personnel capable of applying logic and reasoning to identify strengths and weaknesses of alternative solutions, conclusions, or approaches to such problems. A Masters in Industrial Management specially provides the students a broad-based knowledge and skills required for industrial needs.

Term industrial company 
The term industrial company is generally applied to a manufacturing firm that – contrary to a crafts business – produces consumer durables in factories from raw materials in mass and serial production (a division of labor) using modern manufacturing machines.

History of industrial management 
https://www.infoplease.com/encyclopedia/social-science/economy/concepts/industrial-management/the-development-of-industrial-management

Courses of study
Study programs in industrial management are very popular in economies with a high value of manufacturing output, such as the United States and Germany. Especially German research universities incorporate a large number of advanced courses in engineering in their graduate program in industrial management and are, thus, more like M.Eng.- programs. Degree programs are also offered under the title "industrial administration".

Specialization in Industrial Management
Specialization in Industrial Management is designed to address and solve real life problems relating to industrial set-ups. Collaboration with relevant industries and financial institutes is its modus operandi. This specialization is one of the very few aimed at mid-career professionals who wish to make the move to senior management within industrial and manufacturing organizations. It is designed to provide the business expertise essential for all senior managers by integrating specific engineering subjects with the management of technology and manufacturing systems. The specialization also examines the latest business thinking and provides expert knowledge on engineering and technology issues and theories. Topics such as finance, marketing, management strategy are integrated with modern industrial issues such as project and quality management, manufacturing effectiveness, advanced manufacturing technology and supply chain management.

References

External links 
 Krannert School of Management
 History MIT Sloan School of Management
 Hector School am Karlsruher Institute of Technology
 Esslingen Graduate School - MBA in Industrial Management 
 TUM School of Management
  

Management education